Leti Arts is a Ghanaian video game company headquartered in Accra. It was founded by Eyram Tawia, a member of the Harambe Entrepreneur Alliance, and has emerged as one of largest and successful video games companies in Africa.

References

External links 
 

2007 establishments in Ghana
Companies based in Accra
Video game companies established in 2007
Video game companies of Ghana
Video game development companies
Video game publishers